Izuagbe Ugonoh (born 2 November 1986) is a Polish mixed martial artist and former professional boxer and kickboxer. He is a graduate of the Jędrzej Śniadecki University School of Physical Education and Sport in Gdańsk.

Early life
Izuagbe was born to Nigerian parents in the Polish city of Szczecin. He graduated from the Jędrzej Śniadecki University School of Physical Educations and Sport in Gdańsk.

Kickboxing career
He trained kick boxing at Gdańsk club GKSK Corpus. Due to his similarity in appearance and fighting style he is sometimes called the Polish Remy Bonjasky. He has also been inspired by Gökhan Saki.

In 2009, in the Austrian city of Villach, he won the Kickboxing World Championships gold medal in K-1 Rules to 91 kg, defeating Vladimir Mineev. In 2010, he became European champion in the same formula in Baku. He met the local Zamig Athakishiyev in the final.

Professional boxing career

Early career

On 16 October 2010, he made his professional debut as a boxer in Legionowo, beating Igoris Papunia from Lithuania by first-round knockout. He fought his second professional fight on 20 November 2010, in a show in Nysa, during which he defeated Pavel Habra by technical KO in the first round. Ugonoh's first fight of 2011 was against Rad Rashid on the 2 April. Ugonoh won the bout by unanimous decision over four rounds. Ugonoh went on to gain five stoppage wins by the end of 2012. He fought once in 2013, defeating Lukasz Rusiewicz by unanimous decision in a six-round bout. In 2014, Ugonoh started training under Kevin Barry while being signed to Duco Events, and became a regular sparring partner for Joseph Parker.  Ugonoh also fought once in 2014 knocking out Junior Maletino Lakopo in two rounds.

Ugonoh next fought on the 5 March 2015, against Thomas Peato. Ugonoh won the bout by second-round knockout. He went on to gain wins over Julius Long and Will Quarrie before facing Ibrahim Labaran for the interim WBA Oceania and WBO Africa heavyweight titles. Ugonoh won the fight by first-round knockout. He also got a first-round knockout win against Vicente Sandez in December 2015. Ugonoh's first fight of 2016 was against Ricardo Humberto Ramirez, which he won by knockout in the fourth round. Ugonoh next fought on the 1 October, knocking out Gregory Tony in two rounds to pick up the vacant IBF Mediterranean heavyweight title. In December 2016, Ugonoh left his promoter Duco Events David Higgins after being with them for two years. Ugonoh shortly signed with Al Haymon after his departure from Duco.

Ugonoh vs. Breazeale
On the 25 February 2017, Ugonoh faced former world title challenger Dominic Breazeale on the under card of Deontay Wilder vs Gerald Washington, in Birmingham, Alabama, USA. Breazeale was ranked #11 by the WBC at heavyweight at the time. Ugonoh was ranked 7th in WBO and 9th in IBF. In a back and forth fight which saw both men hit the canvas, Breazeale came out on top after he dropped Ugonoh through the ropes in the fifth round. The fights' third round won the round of the year from The Ring Magazine. This was the last fight Ugonoh fought under his trainer Kevin Barry.

Career from 2018
After losing to Breazeale in 2017, Ugonoh next returned to the ring on the 25 May 2018.

Ugonoh vs. Kassi 
Ugonoh faced Fred Kassi in a ten-round bout, winning the fight by stoppage after Kassi was retired on his stool at the end of the second round.

Professional boxing titles
 World Boxing Association
 interim Oceania heavyweight title
 World Boxing Organization
 interim  Africa heavyweight title
 Africa heavyweight title
 International Boxing Federation 
 Mediterranean heavyweight title

Professional boxing record

Mixed martial arts career
On July 11, 2020, news surfaced that Ugonoh transitioned from boxing to mixed martial arts and had signed a contract with Konfrontacja Sztuk Walki. He made his mixed martial arts debut at KSW 54 on August 29, 2020. In his first fight he defeated Quentin Domingos.

Ugonoh was scheduled to make his sophomore MMA appearance against the undefeated heavyweight prospect Thomas Narmo at KSW 60, but Narmo was forced off the card on March 6 with an rib injury. The undeafeated German Uğur Özkaplan served as Narmo's replacement. In turn, Özkaplan was replaced by Marek Samociuk. He lost the bout via TKO in the second round after gassing in the first round.

Ugonoh rematched with Marek Samociuk at KSW 70 on May 28, 2022. He lost the bout again, losing via TKO stoppage due to ground and pound in the first round.

Mixed martial arts record

|-
|Loss
|align=center|1–2
|Marek Samociuk
|TKO (punches)
|KSW 70: Pudzianowski vs. Materla
|
|align=center|1
|align=center|3:38
|Łódź, Poland
|
|-
|Loss
|align=center|1–1
|Marek Samociuk
|TKO (punches)
|KSW 60: De Fries vs. Narkun 2
|
|align=center|2
|align=center|0:27
|Łódź, Poland
|
|-
|Win
|align=center|1–0
|Quentin Domingos
|TKO (leg injury)
|KSW 54: Gamrot vs. Ziółkowski
|
|align=center|1
|align=center|2:22
|Warsaw, Poland
|

Personal life
Ugonoh also played a wrestling cameo in the Polish movie Afonia and the bees (2009) directed by Jan Jakub Kolski.

He calls himself a "black Pole" and says that he proudly represents Poland on the international arena. He often jokes that when he looks into a mirror, he "doesn't know what happened", referring to his skin color as atypical for ethnic Poles, a white ethnic group.

His sister, Osuenhe "Osi" Ugonoh, works as a professional model, and is known for winning Poland's 4th edition of Top Model reality television series in 2014.

See also
 List of current KSW fighters
 List of male mixed martial artists

References

External links 

Izuagbe Ugonoh at Polish FilmWeb

Boxers trained by Kevin Barry
Polish male kickboxers
Polish people of Nigerian descent
1986 births
Living people
Sportspeople from Szczecin
Polish male boxers
Sportspeople from Gdańsk
Polish male mixed martial artists
Heavyweight boxers
Nigerian male boxers
Nigerian male kickboxers
Nigerian male mixed martial artists
Mixed martial artists utilizing boxing
Mixed martial artists utilizing kickboxing